Paweł Olszewski (born 7 June 1999) is a Polish professional footballer who plays as a right-back for Jagiellonia Białystok.

Career
In July 2017, Olszewski joined Wigry Suwałki on a two-year loan. In July 2019, he was loaned out again, this time to Stal Mielec for the 2019/20 season.

References

External links
 
 

1999 births
Living people
Polish footballers
Poland youth international footballers
Ekstraklasa players
I liga players
III liga players
Jagiellonia Białystok players
Wigry Suwałki players
Stal Mielec players
Association football defenders
Sportspeople from Wrocław